Marcos Leonardo Santos Almeida (born 2 May 2003), known as Marcos Leonardo, is a Brazilian footballer who plays for Santos FC as a forward.

Club career

Born in Itapetinga, Bahia, Marcos Leonardo moved to Taubaté, São Paulo in May 2014, and joined Santos' youth setup in August, after a trial. On 23 October 2019, he signed his first professional contract with the club, agreeing to a three-year deal.

On 21 July 2020, Marcos Leonardo was one of the five youth graduates registered for the year's Campeonato Paulista. He made his professional – and Série A – debut on 20 August, coming on as a second-half substitute for Yeferson Soteldo in a 1–0 away win against Sport Recife.

On 15 September 2020, Marcos Leonardo made his Copa Libertadores debut by replacing Raniel in a 0–0 home draw against Club Olimpia. He scored his first professional goal on 4 October, netting his team's third in a 3–2 away win against Goiás.

On 20 October 2020, Marcos Leonardo scored the winner in a 2–1 home success over Defensa y Justicia, becoming the sixth-youngest to score in the Libertadores, and the fourth-youngest Brazilian. He spent the 2021 campaign as a backup option, initially behind fellow youth graduate Kaio Jorge and subsequently behind new signing Léo Baptistão.

On 15 January 2022, Marcos Leonardo agreed to renew his contract with Santos until 2026.

International career
Marcos Leonardo represented Brazil at under-17 level, playing in the 2019 Montaigu Tournament and UEFA Development Tournament. On 12 February 2021, he and Santos teammate Renyer were called up to the under-18s.

Personal life
Marcos Leonardo's father, known as Marcos Coringa, was also a footballer and a forward. He would only appear in amateur tournaments in his native Bahia, however.

Career statistics

References

External links

Santos FC profile 

2003 births
Living people
Sportspeople from Bahia
Brazilian footballers
Association football forwards
Campeonato Brasileiro Série A players
Santos FC players
Brazil youth international footballers